
Gmina Panki is a rural gmina (administrative district) in Kłobuck County, Silesian Voivodeship, in southern Poland.

The gmina contains part of the protected area called Upper Liswarta Forests Landscape Park.

Villages
Gmina Panki contains the villages and settlements of Aleksandrów, Cyganka, Jaciska, Janiki, Kałmuki, Kawki, Konieczki, Koski Pierwsze, Kostrzyna, Kotary, Pacanów, Praszczyki, Żerdzina and Zwierzyniec Trzeci.

Neighbouring gminas
Gmina Panki is bordered by the gminas of Krzepice, Opatów, Przystajń and Wręczyca Wielka.

References

Panki
Kłobuck County